Take the Floor may refer to:
Take the Floor (Scottish radio programme), airing on BBC Radio Scotland
"Take The Floor", a song from Made Up Stories (album) by Go:Audio